Mi pequeña traviesa, (Little Miss Mischief) is a Mexican telenovela produced by Pedro Damián for Televisa in 1997–1998. Michelle Vieth and Héctor Soberón star as the protagonists, while Arleth Terán, Mariana Seoane and Khotan star as the antagonists. It is based on the Argentine telenovela Me llaman Gorrión.

Cast

Awards and nominations

International release of Mi pequeña traviesa 

 : Telefe 
 : Paravisión
 : Channel 7
 : Univision

External links 

Televisa telenovelas
1997 telenovelas
Mexican telenovelas
1997 Mexican television series debuts
1998 Mexican television series endings
Mexican television series based on Argentine television series
Spanish-language telenovelas